Anselmo García MacNulty (born 19 February 2003) is a professional footballer who plays as a defender for Eerste Divisie club NAC Breda, on loan from VfL Wolfsburg. Born in Spain, he is a youth international for the Republic of Ireland.

Club career
He came through at his hometown club Real Betis before moving to VFL Wolfsburg in 2019. He joined NAC Breda on loan in July 2022 and made his debut in the Eerste Divisie on 5 August 2022, in a 1-0 win against Helmond Sport.

International career
He was born and raised in Seville, Spain but qualifies for Ireland through his mother who is from County Clare. He would visit Ireland every summer with his family and chose to represent Ireland from U15 level, and this continued through to his playing at U19 level for Ireland and then call ups to the Irish U21 squad. He has not, however, ruled out playing for the country of his birth at a later date.

References

2003 births
Living people
Footballers from Seville
Republic of Ireland association footballers
Republic of Ireland youth international footballers
Spanish footballers
Irish people of Spanish descent
Spanish people of Irish descent
Citizens of Ireland through descent
Association football defenders
VfL Wolfsburg players
NAC Breda players
Eerste Divisie players
Irish expatriate association footballers
Irish expatriate sportspeople in Germany
Irish expatriate sportspeople in the Netherlands
Spanish expatriate footballers
Spanish expatriate sportspeople in Germany
Spanish expatriate sportspeople in the Netherlands
Expatriate footballers in Germany
Expatriate footballers in the Netherlands